Nils van 't Hoenderdaal (born 3 October 1993) is a Dutch track cyclist.

Career
In 2011 Van 't Hoenderdaal competed at the 2011 Dutch National Track Championships in the men's sprint and men's keirin, but did not win a medal. A year later at the 2012 Dutch National Track Championships he won the silver medal in the men's keirin. Internationally he won the team sprint at the third round of the 2013–14 UCI Track Cycling World Cup in Aguascalientes, Mexico together with Hugo Haak and Matthijs Büchli. He won the gold medal in the team sprint at the 2015 UEC European Track Championships in Grenchen, Switzerland, together with Jeffrey Hoogland and Hugo Haak.

References

1993 births
Living people
Dutch male cyclists
Cyclists from Amsterdam
Dutch cyclists at the UCI Track Cycling World Championships
Olympic cyclists of the Netherlands
Cyclists at the 2016 Summer Olympics
UCI Track Cycling World Champions (men)
European Championships (multi-sport event) gold medalists
Cyclists at the 2019 European Games
European Games medalists in cycling
European Games gold medalists for the Netherlands
21st-century Dutch people